Antonín Kasper may refer to:
Antonín Kasper Sr. (1932–2017), Czech speedway rider, Speedway World Team Cup medallist
Antonín Kasper Jr. (1962–2006), his son, Czech speedway rider, 1982 Individual U-21 World Champion